Marcus Asinius Sabinianus or Sabinian was proconsul of the Roman province of Africa. In 240 he led a revolt against Gordian III. He proclaimed himself emperor, but after being defeated by the governor of Mauretania, his supporters in Carthage surrendered him to the imperial authorities.

References 

 Meckler, Michael L., "Gordian III (238–244  A.D.)", De Imperatoribus Romanis
 

240s deaths
Year of birth unknown
3rd-century Roman usurpers
Crisis of the Third Century
Asinii
Self-proclaimed monarchy